Barbingant (maybe Pierre; fl. c. 1460) was a French composer to whom is attributed the earliest known surviving parody mass, a three-voice mass based on the virelai "Terriblement suis fortunée". Barbignant's chanson "Au travail suis" was the base of a parody mass by Ockeghem. His works are included in the Opera Omnia of the slightly later composer Jacob Barbireau, choirmaster at Antwerp, but the two composers are separated in musicology after 1960.

References

French composers